The National Television Award for Most Popular Drama Series is one of the award categories presented annually by the National Television Awards (NTA). It was introduced in 1995 when the event was first initiated. The winners are selected by the public.

Winners and nominees

1990s

2000s

2010s

2020s

Multiple wins
6 wins
 Doctor Who (5 consecutive)

4 wins
 Downton Abbey

2 wins
 Bad Girls (consecutive)
 The Bill 
 Peaky Blinders (consecutive)

Multiple nominations
12 nominations
 Doctor Who (11 consecutive)

10 nominations
 The Bill (3 consecutive)

8 nominations
 Casualty

7 nominations
 Bad Girls (consecutive)

6 nominations
 A Touch of Frost

5 nominations
 Downton Abbey (consecutive)

4 nominations
 Call the Midwife

3 nominations
 Desperate Housewives
 Merlin
 Shameless
 Sherlock
 Where the Heart Is

2 nominations
 Band of Gold
 Broadchurch
 Game of Thrones
 Heartbeat
 London's Burning
 Waterloo Road

See also
 British Academy Television Award for Best Drama Series

References

National Television Awards